The RWD 18 was a four/five seat STOL (Short Take-Off and Landing) utility aircraft designed and built in Poland from 1936.

Development 
DWL studied a small twin-engined STOL utility aircraft as a private venture due to the lack of official support, hoping to kindle new markets in multi-engined, utility and business aircraft.
The RWD 18s safe handling characteristics and STOL capability were derived from the full span leading edge slats, which were operated by servo suction from a leading edge mounted venturi tube, and the fixed tri-cycle undercarriage. Construction was to have been mixed with wooden cantilever high wings having anhedral on the inner sections, fitted with full span powered leading edge slats and trailing edge flaps. The fuselage was a welded steel tube framework faired with wooden formers, covered with plywood and fabric, fitted out with a dual control cockpit and a bench seat in the cabin for two or three. At the rear of the fuselage a cantilever twin finned wooden tail unit was fitted to improve low-speed yaw control and stability. The spatted undercarriage legs were cantilevered from the engine nacelles and the fuselage under the nose with the main wheels fitted with 'Bendix' pneumatic brake units and the nosewheel steerable from the rudder bar. Any engine of around 150 hp could be fitted, but the prototype was fitted with 150 hp Cirrus Major four-cylinder inverted in-line engines fitted in nacelles at the junctions of the inner and outer wings.
An RWD 9 was converted to the RWD 20, by fitting a tri-cycle undercarriage, to speed the development of the RWD 18s, with extensive trials carried out including rough and ploughed field landings, take-offs and taxiing. Flight trials were scheduled to be carried out in December 1939 but the incomplete prototype was destroyed in an air raid during the German invasion of 1939.

Specifications (RWD 18 estimated)

See also

References

 Taylor, J. H. (ed) (1989) Jane's Encyclopedia of Aviation. Studio Editions: London. p. 29
 Cynk, Jerzy B.. “Polish Aircraft 1893 – 1939”. London, Putnam. 1971. 
 Glass, Andrzej: "Biographical Dictionary of Polish Engineers", volume 14: 2003 Warsaw, p. 24: Tadeusz Chyliński (Polish)

External links

 http://rwd-dwl.net/samoloty/rwd_18/index.htm
 RWD (aircraft manufacturer)
 http://rwd-dwl.net/pracownicy/duleba/index.htm
 http://rwd-dwl.net/pracownicy/chylinski/index.htm

RWD aircraft
Abandoned civil aircraft projects
1930s Polish civil utility aircraft
High-wing aircraft
Twin piston-engined tractor aircraft